Denbigh is a small unincorporated community in Warwick County, Virginia, USA, today Newport News City and was long the county seat. After a municipal consolidation in 1958, it became a neighborhood of the independent city of Newport News.

History
Denbigh was named for Denbigh Plantation, which was patented by Captain Samuel Matthews, who came to Virginia before 1618, filled several important posts, and became the father of Lt. Col. Samuel Mathews, a royal governor of the Virginia Commonwealth from 1656–1660. His son John Mathews (b. 1659 – May 1, 1706) married Elizabeth Tavernor on March 24, 1684 and they also made their home at the Denbigh Plantation.

The first courthouse and jail were located nearby, at Warwick Towne, established in 1680. In 1790, Warwick County recorded 1,690 persons in the Federal Census, making it the third-smallest county population-wise in Virginia. After the American Revolution, in 1809, Warwick Towne was abandoned, and the county seat was moved to the area of Denbigh Plantation, near Stoney Run.

The town of Denbigh was the county seat of Warwick County from 1810 until 1952, except for a short period from 1888 to 1896 when the courthouse was located in what is now downtown Newport News. It was moved back to Denbigh when Newport News became an independent city in 1896.

Warwick County became an independent city itself in 1952. Six years later, in 1958, the City of Warwick consolidated with the independent City of Newport News, assuming the latter's better-known name.

Denbigh as a neighborhood of Newport News
The present-day City of Newport News essentially includes all the territory of Warwick River Shire, formed in 1634 in commonwealth Virginia, which became Warwick County in 1643. The former town of Denbigh is now considered a neighborhood area of Newport News. The preserved 1810 Warwick County Courthouse at Denbigh is now a museum.

The Denbigh neighborhood is in the north side of the city, and covers most of the area around the former town. Denbigh Boulevard, which for much of its length carries State Route 173, is a north-south connector road linking the two main east-west arterial roads running through the city, U.S. Route 60 (Warwick Boulevard) and State Route 143 (Jefferson Avenue). Many businesses and shopping centers are located along this road. Denbigh High School, located on Denbigh Boulevard, is part of the Newport News Public Schools division.

References

See also
Warwick County, Virginia
Newport News, Virginia
List of former counties, cities, and towns of Virginia

Unincorporated communities in Virginia
Neighborhoods in Newport News, Virginia
Former county seats in Virginia